C'Mon Kids was an Australian children's television show which screened on the Nine Network from 1986 to 1990. It was produced in Adelaide, South Australia and screened on weekday afternoons.

Synopsis 
The show had a number of hosts or presenters who were accompanied by puppet co-hosts Winky Dink, a puppet portrayed/voiced by actress Wendy Patching or Frank Duck, portrayed/voiced by actor Maurie Annese.

The show consisted of small educational editorials presented in a variety of segments and cartoons. The segments featured a number of regular presenters and reporters including Robin Roenfeldt, Tammy Macintosh, Narelle Higson, Joanna Moore, Vicki Radenge, Stephanie Raethal and Mark Fantasia.

See also
 List of Australian television series
 Wombat
 Fat Cat and Friends
 Play School

References

External links

Australian children's television series
Australian television shows featuring puppetry
Nine Network original programming
1986 Australian television series debuts
1990 Australian television series endings